Keegan Soehn (born August 21, 1992, in Red Deer, Alberta) is a Canadian trampoline gymnast. He won the gold medal in the individual event at the 2011 Pan American Games.
He won the 2015 Pan American Games in Toronto becoming the first male to win back to back medals in the Trampoline event. He has Taken part in the 2012 and 2016 Olympic Games held in London and Rio de Janeiro respectively. He has been ranked among the top trampolinists in the world along with Jason Burnett.)
In 2022, he was slected in the canadian team in 2022 Pan American Gymnastics Championships . he took silver in the synchronised trampoline together with Nathan Shuh and silver medal in individual trampoline.

References

1992 births
Living people
Canadian male trampolinists
Pan American Games gold medalists for Canada
Pan American Games medalists in gymnastics
Gymnasts at the 2011 Pan American Games
Gymnasts at the 2015 Pan American Games
Sportspeople from Red Deer, Alberta
Medalists at the Trampoline Gymnastics World Championships
Medalists at the 2011 Pan American Games
Medalists at the 2015 Pan American Games
21st-century Canadian people